The 1999 Atlantic hurricane season had five Category 4 hurricanes – the highest number recorded in a single season in the Atlantic basin, previously tied in 1961, and later tied in 2005 and 2020. The season officially began on June 1, and ended on November 30. These dates conventionally delimit the period of each year when most tropical cyclones form in the Atlantic basin. It was a fairly active season, mostly due to a persistent La Niña that developed in the latter half of 1998. The first storm, Arlene, formed on June 11 to the southeast of Bermuda. It meandered slowly for a week and caused no impact on land. Other tropical cyclones that did not affect land were Hurricane Cindy, Tropical Storm Emily, and Tropical Depression Twelve. Localized or otherwise minor damage occurred from Hurricanes Bret, Gert, and Jose, and tropical storms Harvey and Katrina.

The most significant storm of the season was Hurricane Floyd, a strong Category 4 hurricane that caused devastating flooding along the East Coast of the United States, especially in North Carolina. Damage from the storm totaled approximately $6.5 billion (1999 USD) and there were at least 77 fatalities, making it the deadliest hurricane in the United States since Hurricane Agnes in 1972. Flooding from Floyd in North Carolina followed Hurricane Dennis, a slow and erratic–moving storm that dropped heavy rainfall in the eastern portion of the state. Tropical Depression Eleven in October contributed to extreme flooding in Mexico, which left 636 people dead and caused $491.3 million in damage, though impact could not be distinguished from the storm itself. Hurricane Irene caused extensive flooding in Cuba and Florida, with lesser effects in the Bahamas and North Carolina. Irene was the second–costliest storm of the season, with about $800 million in damage. Hurricane Lenny was an unusual eastward–moving storm in the Caribbean Sea and a strong late–season storm. It caused extensive damage in the Lesser Antilles in the month of November. Collectively, the storms of the 1999 Atlantic hurricane season caused at least 123 fatalities and $8.328 billion in losses.

Seasonal forecasts

Pre-season outlooks

Ahead of and during each hurricane season, various national meteorological services, scientific agencies, and noted hurricane experts issue forecasts of hurricane activity. These include forecasters from the United States National Oceanic and Atmospheric Administration (NOAA)'s National Hurricane and Climate Prediction Center's, William M. Gray and his associates at Colorado State University (CSU), as well as Weather Research Center (WRC) and Tropical Storm Risk (TSR), then known as TSUNAMI. The forecasts include weekly or monthly assessments of the significant factors that help determine the number of tropical storms, hurricanes, and major hurricanes within a particular year.

Gray and his team at CSU issued their initial season outlook on December 4, 1998, predicting fourteen named storms, nine hurricanes, and four major hurricanes. The three main factors for this above average season forecast cited included a continuation of abnormally warm sea surface temperatures, the probability that La Niña conditions would remain, and that the quasi-biennial oscillation (QBO) winds would be in a westerly phase. Early in 1999, WRC issued its forecast for the season, projecting ten named storms and six hurricanes, but no prediction on the number of major hurricanes. In subsequent outlooks from Gray and his associates in April, June, and August, the predictions were unchanged.

On April 7, CSU noted that the probability of a major hurricane landfall in the United States was 72%, including a 54% chance on the East Coast and a 40% likelihood on the Gulf Coast. In their outlook on May 27, experts at NOAA noted that an above average season was a strong possibility. An addition to a La Niña, vertical wind shear would be decreased across much of the Caribbean Sea and tropical Atlantic Ocean, and a favorable jet pattern for tropical waves to develop into tropical cyclones. On June 1, TSR predicted that there would be 12 named storms, 7 hurricanes, and 2 major hurricanes.

As stated by NOAA and CSU, an average Atlantic hurricane season between 1981–2010 contains roughly 12 tropical storms, 6 hurricanes, 3 major hurricanes, and an accumulated cyclone energy (ACE) Index of 66–103 units. NOAA typically categorizes a season as either above-average, average, of below-average based on the cumulative ACE Index; however, the number of tropical storms, hurricanes, and major hurricanes within a hurricane season is considered occasionally as well.

Seasonal summary

The Atlantic hurricane season officially began on June 1, 1999, and the first tropical cyclone developed on June 11. It was an above–average season in which 16 tropical cyclones formed. Twelve depressions attained tropical storm status, and eight of these became hurricanes. Five hurricanes intensified further into major hurricanes. The season featured a record-breaking five Category 4 hurricanes, later tied in 2005 and 2020. These were Bret, Cindy, Floyd, Gert, and Hurricane Lenny. The last storm of the season, Hurricane Lenny, dissipated on November 23, which was about a week before the official season ending on November 30, 1999.

A persistent La Niña that developed during the previous season was attributed to the above average activity. Between August and October, there was very low wind shear over the Caribbean Sea and western Atlantic Ocean, attributed to a combination of abnormal upper-level easterly winds and low-level westerly winds. Six hurricanes and two tropical storms made landfall during the season and caused at least 123 deaths and approximately $8.19 billion in damage. Hurricane Gert also caused damage and fatalities, despite not making landfall.
 
Overall, the season's activity was reflected with a high cumulative accumulated cyclone energy (ACE) rating of 177. ACE is, broadly speaking, a measure of the power of the hurricane multiplied by the length of time it existed, so storms that last a long time, as well as particularly strong hurricanes, have high ACEs. It is only calculated for full advisories on tropical systems at or exceeding  or tropical storm strength.

Systems

Tropical Storm Arlene

Along a diffuse front, a broad area of low pressure in association with an upper-level low was noted several hundred miles northeast of Puerto Rico on June 8. Initially, the system resembled a subtropical cyclone, due to its frontal characteristics. The nascent depression drifted northward for 24 hours, and during this time, it strengthened and was upgraded to Tropical Storm Arlene at 12:00 UTC on June 12, based on Dvorak satellite classifications. Subsequently, weakening due to westerly wind shear, Arlene tracking westward on June 13 and turned northwest the following day. Because the steering current became poorly defined, it drifted starting on June 15, and executed a small cyclonic loop later that day. At 00:00 UTC on June 17, Arlene was downgraded to a tropical depression. The depression weakened further due to decreasing sea surface temperatures and dissipated early on June 18.

Tropical Depression Two

A tropical wave crossed the west coast of Africa on June 20. As the wave moved into the western Caribbean Sea on June 30, a broad cyclonic turning was noted. The system moved over the Yucatán Peninsula on July 1, a day before emerging into the Bay of Campeche as a weak low pressure area. Later on July 2, deep convection became more organized while the system was centered over the southwestern Gulf of Mexico. By 18:00 UTC, the low developed into Tropical Depression Two. Eight hours later, it dissipated over the mountains of Mexico.

Hurricane Bret

Late on August 18, a tropical wave in the Bay of Campeche spawned Tropical Depression Three. The depression drifted and was initially hampered by wind shear. By late on August 19, the depression was upgraded to Tropical Storm Bret amid more favorable atmosphere conditions. Bret then moved generally northward and strengthened into a hurricane early on August 21. Thereafter, the storm began to weaken while curving west-northwestward. After moving inland, the storm weakened quickly, falling to tropical depression status on August 24. Early the following day, Bret dissipated near the border of Coahuila and Chihuahua.

Bret was a small tropical cyclone that made landfall in a sparsely–populated region of Texas, resulting in relatively little damage. At least 200 homes and large agricultural fields were flooded in Duval County. Strong winds left approximately 64,000 people without electricity in South Texas. Four people died after a truck and a tractor collided near Laredo due to slick roads. In Mexico, the storm brought flooding to Coahuila, Nuevo Leon, and Tamaulipas, with an estimated  of rain falling in Nuevo Leon. Numerous homes in the affected regions were damaged or destroyed, leaving roughly 150 people homeless. Three people died in Mexico – one was trampled to death during evacuation, another was electrocuted, and the third drowned. Overall, the storm caused $15 million in damage.

Hurricane Cindy

On August 18, a tropical wave moved westward off the coast of Africa. With low pressures and gradually organizing convection, Tropical Depression Four developed west of Senegal early on August 19. Initially it failed to intensify due to wind shear, and the center became ill-defined on August 20. After passing south of Cape Verde, the depression intensified into Tropical Storm Cindy as the convection became concentrated around the center. Due to a strong ridge, Cindy moved westward, before turning northwestward by August 21. Banding features gradually increased as outflow improved, and late on August 21, Cindy became a hurricane. Afterward, increased wind shear dislocated the convection from the center, which weakened Cindy to a tropical storm.

The shear decreased on August 24, and the convection increased over the center. By late on August 25, Cindy regained hurricane status. A ragged eye appeared on satellite imagery on August 27, and early the next day it attained major hurricane status. Turning northward, the storm remained at peak intensity until August 30, when prominent wind shear weakened Cindy again. On August 31, Cindy was downgraded to a tropical storm, and later that day it merged with a large extratropical storm northwest of the Azores.

Hurricane Dennis

On the following day, the depression strengthened into Tropical Storm Dennis despite unfavorable westerly shear, which became a hurricane by August 26. After striking the Abaco Islands in the Bahama, conditions improved, allowing for Dennis to strengthen into a Category 2 by August 28. Around this time, Dennis began to move parallel to the Southeastern United States. By the following day, steering currents collapsed and the storm interacted with a cold front, causing Dennis to move erratically offshore North Carolina. Wind shear and cold air associated with the front weakened Dennis to a tropical storm on September 1 and removed some of its tropical characteristics. Eventually, warmer ocean temperatures caused some re-strengthening. By September 4, Dennis turned northwestward and made landfall in Cape Lookout, North Carolina, as a strong tropical storm. The storm slowly weakened inland, before transitioning into an extratropical cyclone over western New York on September 7.

In the Bahamas, Dennis produced moderate winds, rain, and storm surge on San Salvador, Crooked Island, Eleuthera, and Abaco Islands, resulting in damage to roofs and coastal properties. Dennis brought  waves to the east coast of Florida, causing minor erosion and four drowning deaths. The waves left severe erosion and coastal flooding along the Outer Banks of North Carolina. In Carteret, Craven, and Dare counties, the storm damaged at least 2,025 homes and businesses to some degree. Although the precipitation was generally beneficial due to drought conditions, it also damaged crops. Two indirect deaths occurred in Richlands during a weather-related car accident. Similar inland flooding occurred in northern and eastern Virginia, with precipitation reaching  near Lawrenceville. A tornado in Hampton severely damaged five apartment complexes, three of which were condemned completely, as well an assisted living facility; about 460 people were forced to evacuate from the buildings, and as many as 800 vehicles may have been damaged. Overall damage in North Carolina and Virginia totaled about $157 million. Generally minor flooding occurred in the Mid-Atlantic and New England.

Tropical Storm Emily

A tropical wave ahead of Hurricane Cindy exited the west coast of Africa on August 15. Minimal development occurred initially, although the structure gradually organized as it approached the Windward Islands. The depression strengthened into Tropical Storm Emily six hours later. The agency initially predicted that the storm would intensify into a hurricane near the Windward Islands. Increased wind shear generated by Hurricane Cindy caused Emily to weaken slightly on August 25. Emily began moving slowly northwestward and progressively became more influenced by Cindy, developing occasional convective bursts. Later on August 26, the movement turned northward, well offshore the Lesser Antilles. Eventually, the storm no longer produced convective bursts, and by 12:00 UTC on August 28, Emily weakened to a tropical depression. Six hours later, the storm was absorbed into Cindy northeast of the Leeward Islands.

Tropical Depression Seven

Interaction between a strong monsoon-type flow and a tropical wave in the Bay of Campeche resulted in the development of Tropical Depression Seven on September 5. Shortly thereafter, the center of circulation of the depression became difficult to locate, but was likely heading north-northwestward. Due to warm ocean temperatures, the SHIPS model predicted further intensification, despite the storm having almost no deep convection and being close to land.

The depression quickly weakened inland, and dissipated about twenty-four hours after landfall. Due to forecasts that the depression would strengthen to a tropical storm, the government of Mexico issued a tropical storm warning for Tampico to Matamoros, Tamaulipas. The storm caused heavy rainfall in Mexico, with as much as  falling in Ciudad Mante in the state of Tamaulipas.

Hurricane Floyd

The depression strengthened and was upgraded to Tropical Storm Floyd on the following day. Floyd became a hurricane on September 10, while curving northwestward, before the storm resumed its initial west-northwestward course late on the following day. Significant intensification occurred on September 12 and September 13. Thereafter, the storm began weakening while approaching the Bahamas, decreasing to Category 3 intensity at 06:00 UTC on September 14. Shortly before striking the Abaco Islands at 19:00 UTC, the hurricane re-intensified into a Category 4 hurricane. Floyd weakened to a Category 2 hurricane late on September 15, while re-curving to the north-northeast. Thereafter, the storm rapidly weakened and was a tropical storm by early on the following day. Floyd moved along the coasts of the Delmarva Peninsula and New Jersey, before striking Long Island in New York early on September 17. Shortly thereafter, Floyd transitioned into an extratropical cyclone while interacting with a frontal zone over Maine.

In the Bahamas, a combination of strong winds and storm surge destroyed numerous restaurants, hotels, shops, and homes, and left tens of thousands without water, electricity, and food. One death was reported. Although millions of people in Florida evacuated, damage was relatively minor. As a result, hundreds of trees were downed, which damaged at 467 houses, and several hotels and businesses. Impact in Georgia and South Carolina was minor. North Carolina bore the brunt of the storm. Heavy precipitation fell in the eastern portion of the state, peaking at  near Southport. Numerous rivers experienced at least 500-year floods, causing extensive flooding. About 7,000 homes were destroyed and an additional 56,000 suffered damage, of which 17,000 houses were left uninhabitable. At the height of the storm, more than 500,000 people lacked electricity. Thirty-five fatalities and about $4 billion in damage occurred in North Carolina.

There were three deaths and $101 million in losses. In Maryland, flooding damaged at least 694 homes, impacted numerous bridges and roads, and left over 250,000 residents without power. Similar effects occurred in Delaware, with at least 171 houses damaged and numerous roads being inundated or washed out. In Pennsylvania, flash flooding affected over 10,000 homes and left more than 500,000 people without electricity. Losses reached $60 million and there were 13 deaths in the state. The storm also caused significant impact in New Jersey, where 3,978 homes, 1,358 apartments, and 1,758 businesses were destroyed or suffered major damage. Six deaths occurred in the state. New York, New England, and Atlantic Canada also experienced flooding, but to a much lesser degree. In New York City, Floyd dropped  of rainfall at the Central Park observatory, setting a daily record for precipitation on September 16. Overall, Floyd caused about $6.5 billion in damage and 73 fatalities.

Hurricane Gert

On September 10, a tropical wave moved off the coast of Africa. Due to the development of a low-level circulation and convective banding, the wave became a tropical depression at 12:00 UTC on September 11 to the south of the Cape Verde islands. After increases in intensity, banding features, and outflow improvement, the depression was upgraded to Tropical Storm Gert on September 12 while moving west-northwestward to the south of a subtropical ridge. Warm ocean temperatures and an anticyclone aloft allowed Gert to reach hurricane intensity by the following day. Early on September 15, Gert attained major hurricane strength. An eyewall replacement cyclone, as well as increasing wind shear and an upper-level trough restricting outflow later on, Gert weakened to a low-end Category 3 on September 18.

Gert re-strengthened to a Category 4 hurricane on September 19. However, dry air and colder sea surface temperatures began causing the storm to weaken, with Gert falling to a Category 3 hurricane on September 20 and a Category 2 hurricane on September 21. Accelerating northeastward under the influence of an approaching trough, Gert weakened to a tropical storm on September 23 after convection decreased around the center. About six hours later, the remnants of Gert were absorbed by a larger extratropical storm. For several days, Gert threatened to strike Bermuda, prompting the evacuation of tourists. Although Gert's center did not make landfall, it passed a short distance east of the island, producing hurricane-force winds that left 11,000 people without power. High waves swept two people out to sea at Acadia National Park in Maine. Later, strong waves struck Newfoundland and left heavy marine damage, with about $1.9 million in damage done to a wharf along the Avalon Peninsula.

Tropical Storm Harvey

A tropical wave that emerged into the Atlantic from the west coast of Africa on September 4 reached the Gulf of Mexico by September 18. Following an increase in convection, the system became a tropical depression at 06:00 UTC on September 19. The depression initially tracked due northward and strengthened into Tropical Storm Harvey by early on September 20. Thereafter, no significant change in intensity occurred before the storm made landfall in Everglades City, Florida, late on September 21. Harvey then accelerated across Florida and by early on September 22, merged with a developing extratropical low while located near Grand Bahama. The remnants reached Atlantic Canada before dissipating on September 24.

As a result, at least 34 houses and businesses were flooded. There were sporadic reports of tropical storm-force winds throughout the state,  as well as two tornadoes, neither of which caused left severe impact. Damage estimates in Florida reached about $15 million. Throughout the rest of the United States, impact was limited, confined to light rainfall in Georgia, North Carolina, and South Carolina. Significant flooding, especially to roads and houses, was reported throughout Atlantic Canada, with damage totaling at least $7.6 million.

Tropical Depression Eleven

Until a westward moving tropical wave reached the western Caribbean Sea on September 30, minimal organization occurred. The system eventually emerged into the Gulf of Mexico and developed into Tropical Depression Eleven on October 4. Weak steering current caused the depression to drift slowly and erratically, with the depression initially heading southward, before curving northwest. A surface trough over the central and eastern Gulf of Mexico prevented significant strengthening. While approaching the Gulf Coast of Mexico, the depression was absorbed by the surface trough at 18:00 UTC on October 6.

Throughout Mexico, 90,000 houses were damaged or destroyed, leaving about 500,000 people homeless. and more than 400 people dead.
Flooding caused thousands of landslides and 39 rivers to overflow, leading to the destruction of bridges, houses, widespread crop fields, schools, and electrical networks. Flooding also extended into Central America in late September through early October, causing $40 million (385 million pesos) in crop damage and 70 deaths. However, impact by the depression itself cannot be distinguished.

Tropical Depression Twelve

On September 30, a tropical wave emerged into the Atlantic Ocean from the west coast of Africa. Due to an anticyclone, conditions appeared favorable for significant strengthening, with the National Hurricane Center predicting the depression to be at least a strong tropical storm by October 9. However, wind shear began undercutting the anticyclone, which prevented any significant intensification. Later on October 6, the low-level circulation became exposed to the west of the deep convection. The depression never re-organized and instead deteriorated in structure due to shearing.

Hurricane Irene

A broad trough of low pressure developed into a tropical depression while south of the Isle of Youth on October 12. It headed north and soon intensified into Tropical Storm Irene. On October 14, the storm passed over the Isle of Youth and western Cuba. While over the Straits of Florida, Irene reached hurricane strength. The next day, it made landfall in Key West, Florida, and again near Cape Sable. Later on October 15, Irene moved back over water near Jupiter as a minimal hurricane. It slowly strengthened as it paralleled the East Coast of the United States. However, after accelerating northeast, Irene weakened over the cooler waters of the North Atlantic. On October 19, the hurricane transitioned into an extratropical cyclone near Newfoundland and was absorbed by an extratropical low shortly thereafter.

Irene dropped heavy rainfall throughout its path, especially in Cuba and Florida. Flooding resulted from the heavy rains, damaging more than 27,000 homes and causing significant effects to banana plantations and sugar cane fields. Hurricane forces winds were also reported in Havana. Four fatalities were reported. The storm brought flooding to Florida, particularly the southern portion of the state, where  of rain fell in Boynton Beach. Hundreds were displaced from their homes and thousands were isolated. Five people died from walking through electrified water after a power line fell, while three others drowned after unintentionally driving their vehicle into a canal. Total damage in Florida was around $800 million. The hurricane left five deaths in the Bahamas, one direct and four indirect. Irene also contributed slightly to ongoing flood problems in North Carolina in the aftermath of Hurricane Floyd.

Hurricane Jose

The depression strengthened and by early on October 18, it was upgraded to Tropical Storm Jose. Intensification continued as Jose tracked west-northwestward and Jose reached hurricane status late on October 19. The storm became a Category 2 hurricane, though unfavorable conditions weakened it back. Later on October 21, Jose began moving through the Lesser Antilles as a Category 1 and fell to tropical storm intensity before reentering the Atlantic later that day. While north of Puerto Rico on October 22, Jose re-curved northeastward. The storm eventually began to accelerate and re-strengthen, reaching hurricane status again on October 24. After twelve hours as a hurricane, colder sea surface temperatures weakened Jose to a tropical storm on October 25, shortly before it became extratropical.

About 500 houses and a newly built church were destroyed. About 50% of residents were left without water and 90% of people experienced power outages. Overall, twelve people were injured, one fatality occurred, and an elderly blind man was listed as missing. Flooding in Saint Kitts and Nevis washed out several major roads and caused landslides. Additionally, one person was killed during the storm. In Sint Maarten, mudslides and flooding damaged houses and roads, especially those in low-lying areas. Strong winds and heavy rainfall in Puerto Rico and the United States Virgin Islands caused extensive power outages and minor damage, estimated at $40,000. Overall, losses from the storm was less than $5 million.

Tropical Storm Katrina

A broad area of low pressure associated with remnants of a cold front developed into Tropical Depression Fifteen in the southwestern Caribbean Sea on October 28. Twenty-four hours later, it strengthened into Tropical Storm Katrina. The storm made near landfall Puerto Cabezas, Nicaragua, on October 30. Later that day, Katrina weakened back to a tropical depression. It continued northwestward across Nicaragua and Honduras, before reemerging into the Caribbean Sea off the coast of Honduras on October 31. However, Katrina did not re-intensify and moved inland over the Yucatán Peninsula later that day. While approaching the Gulf of Mexico, Katrina was absorbed by a cold front on November 1.

Katrina dropped heavy rainfall across, which was reported between  throughout Nicaragua and Honduras. As a result of the flooding, roughly 1,200 people were evacuated to emergency shelters in Honduras. Flooding also damage five bridges in Honduras, and the cities of Tocoa and Trujillo were isolated as the Aguán and Siline rivers overflowed their banks. Katrina also destroyed water pipes that were replaced shortly after destruction from Hurricane Mitch.

Hurricane Lenny

The depression began to move in an unusual eastward track across the Caribbean Sea along the southern periphery of a trough and strengthened into Tropical Storm Lenny on the following day. It attained hurricane status south of Jamaica on November 15 and passed south of Hispaniola and Puerto Rico over the next few days. Beginning on November 16, Lenny underwent rapid deepening, becoming a major hurricane early on November 17 while south of the Mona Passage. It gradually weakened due to wind shear while moving through the Leeward Islands, where it struck Saint Martin, Anguilla, and Saint Barthélemy. The system weakened to a tropical storm on November 19.

Before moving through the Lesser Antilles, Lenny produced rough surf that killed two people in northern Colombia. Strong winds and rainfall resulted in heavy crop damage in southeastern Puerto Rico. Lenny brought more heavy rains to areas in the Leeward Islands that had been affected by Hurricane Jose just one month earlier, and brought more damage to areas struck by Hurricane Georges in 1998. Despite the hurricane's passage near Saint Croix at peak intensity, damage on the small island was only described as "moderate", although there was widespread flooding and erosion. Damage in the United States territories totaled about $330 million. On the island, the hurricane killed three people and destroyed more than 200 properties. In nearby Antigua and Barbuda, the hurricane killed one person; torrential rainfall there contaminated the local water supply. Significant storm damage occurred as far south as Grenada, where high surf isolated towns from the capital city.

Storm names
The following names were used during the 1999 Atlantic hurricane season in North Atlantic for systems that reached at least tropical storm intensity. It is the same list used for the 1993 season. A storm was named Lenny for the first (and only) time in 1999.

Retirement

The World Meteorological Organization retired the names Floyd and Lenny in the spring of 2000 and replaced them with Franklin and Lee for use in the 2005 season.

Season effects
This is a table of all the tropical cyclones in the 1999 Atlantic hurricane season. It denotes their durations, names, intensities, areas affected, damages and death tolls. Deaths in parentheses are additional and indirect (an example of an indirect death would be a traffic accident), but are still storm-related. Damage and deaths include totals while the storm was extratropical or a wave or low.

See also

 1998–99 Australian region cyclone season
 1999–00 Australian region cyclone season
 1999 North Indian Ocean cyclone season
 1999 Pacific hurricane season
 1999 Pacific typhoon season
 1998–99 South Pacific cyclone season
 1999–00 South Pacific cyclone season
 1998–99 South-West Indian Ocean cyclone season
 1999–00 South-West Indian Ocean cyclone season
 List of Atlantic hurricanes

Notes

References

External links

 Monthly Weather Review
 National Hurricane Center 1999 Atlantic hurricane season summary

 
Articles which contain graphical timelines
Atlantic hurricane seasons